Wehre is a river in Hesse, Germany. Its source is in the Kaufungen Forest, near the village Rommerode. It flows into the Werra near Eschwege.

See also
List of rivers of Hesse

References

Rivers of Hesse
Rivers of Germany